Dendroceros is a genus of hornworts in the family Dendrocerotaceae.  The genus contains about 51 species native to tropical and sub-tropical regions of the world.

Description 
The epiphytic and epiphyllous Dendroceros is the only desiccation-tolerant hornwort genus. The gametophyte is yellowish-green and usually less than one-half cm wide. The thallus branches in a bifurcating pattern. In the subgenus Apoceros, there are cavities in the central strand of the thallus. The edges of the thallus are only a single layer of cells thick and have an undulating margin. It is common to find symbiotic colonies of blue-green bacteria (usually Nostoc) growing among the cells. Under a microscope, the epidermal cells have trigones.

The sporophyte is erect when mature, growing up to 5 cm tall. Like other hornworts, its surface has stomata.  The interior of the sporophyte differentiates into a central column and a surrounding mass of spores and elater cells, with a distinct spiral. The spores are green and multicellular with an ornamented surface.

Classification

Current classification by Söderström et al. 2016.

Genus Dendroceros Nees 1846
 D. australis Stephani 1909
 D. crassicostatus Stephani 1917
 D. exalatus Stephani 1909c
 D. gracilis Stephani 1917b
 D. humboldtensis Hürlimann 1960
 D. rarus Stephani 1917b
 D. reticulus Herzog 1950b
 D. subtropicus Wild 1893
 D. tahitensis Ångström 1873
 D. vesconianus Gottsche ex Bescherelle 1898
 D. wattsianus Stephani 1909
 Subgenus (Cichoraceus) Peñaloza-Bojacá & Maciel-Silva 2019
 D. cichoraceus (Montagne 1845) Stephani 1916
 Subgenus (Dendroceros) Nees 1846
 D. acutilobus Stephani 1909
 D. adglutinatus (Hooker & Taylor 1845) Gottsche, Lindenberg & Nees 1846
 D. allionii Stephani 1917
 D. breutelii Nees 1846
 D. crassinervis (Nees 1846) Stephani 1917
 D. crispus (Swartz 1788) Nees 1846
 D. foliicola Hasegawa 1980
 D. herasii Infante 2010
 D. javanicus (Nees 1830) Nees 1846
 D. paivae Garcia, Sérgio & Villarreal 2012
 D. rigidus Stephani 1917
 D. subplanus Stephani 1909
 D. tubercularis Hattori 1944
 D. validus Stephani 1917
 Subgenus (Nodulosus) Peñaloza-Bojacá & Maciel-Silva 2019
 D. africanus Stephani 1917
 D. borbonicus Stephani 1892
 D. crispatus (Hooker 1830) Nees 1917
 D. granulatus Mitten 1871
 D. japonicus Stephani 1909
 Subgenus (Apoceros) Schuster 1987b
 D. cavernosus Hasegawa 1980
 D. cucullatus Stephani 1923
 D. difficilis Stephani 1917
 D. muelleri Stephani 1889
 D. ogeramnangus Piippo 1993
 D. pedunculatus Stephani 1909
 D. seramensis Hasegawa 1986
 D. subdifficilis Hattori 1951

Habitat 
Dendroceros grows on humid ground, rocky outcrops, and on the sides of trees.  Its name literally means "tree horn".

References

External links

Hornworts
Taxa named by Christian Gottfried Daniel Nees von Esenbeck
Bryophyte genera